Kothai is a river in the Kanyakumari district of Tamil Nadu state, India, which originates from the Kodayar Lake. Kothai is name of a female in Tamil. In Tamil it means " Beautiful girl of no mistakes "(Kuttram illadha Azhagiya pen)"

Kanyakumari
Thiruvattar